Te Aritaua Pītama (23 February 1906 – 14 March 1958) was a New Zealand  teacher, broadcaster and concert party producer. Of Māori descent, he identified with the Ngāi Tahu iwi. He was born in Tuahiwi, Canterbury, New Zealand, in 1906.

References

1906 births
1958 deaths
New Zealand broadcasters
Ngāi Tahu people
New Zealand Māori schoolteachers
New Zealand educators
New Zealand Māori broadcasters
People from Tuahiwi